David Michael Croft (born 19 June 1970) is a British television broadcaster for Sky Sports. He is the lead commentator for Sky's Formula One coverage, a role he has held since 2012. He was born and raised in Stevenage, England.

Early career
Croft began his broadcasting career in hospital radio at Radio Fairfield. He spent three years working at BBC Three Counties Radio, first as a sports reporter then as sports editor. He moved to BBC Radio 5 Live in December 1998. During his time at the station he covered the 2002 FIFA World Cup, 2004 Athens Summer Olympics and presented Saturday Sport on 5 during both the summer of 2004 and 2005.

BBC Sport commentator

Formula One commentator
Croft was the BBC Radio 5 Live Formula One commentator and presenter, succeeding Maurice Hamilton at the start of the 2006 Formula 1 season. He worked alongside former Super Aguri, Honda and Minardi F1 driver Anthony Davidson and pitlane reporters Ted Kravitz and Natalie Pinkham, covering each Grand Prix and qualifying as well as the three practice sessions which could be heard via the BBC Red Button service, BBC Sport Online and BBC Radio 5 Live Sports Extra. It was announced on 7 December 2011 that Croft would be lead commentator for Sky Sports' coverage of F1 for the 2012 season, and would be joined by Anthony Davidson, Ted Kravitz, Natalie Pinkham and Martin Brundle.

Croft celebrated his 250th Grand Prix as a Formula One commentator at the 2019 Azerbaijan Grand Prix.

Other sports
Croft has also commentated on the BDO World Darts Championship and Winmau World Masters for BBC Television from 2004 to 2012 after first covering the World Championship for BBC Radio 5 Live in 2002. From 2013 onwards, Croft has been working as a presenter and occasional commentator for Sky Sports' coverage of Professional Darts Corporation events.

Further commentary work

His work outside the BBC has included commentary on:
two rounds of the 2010 FIA GT1 World Championship and FIA GT3 European Championship in Brno and Portimao as well as one round of the 2011 FIA GT1 World Championship and FIA GT3 European Championship season, both at Silverstone.
Boxing for Premier Sports including an early Tyson Fury fight 
boxing for Setanta Sports including Joe Calzaghe's farewell fight against Roy Jones Jr. at Madison Square Garden
the 2008 and 2009 Free Running World Championship
the 2009 Goodwood Revival and 2010, 2011 and 2012 Goodwood Festival of Speed
The Race on Sky 1
Red Bull Track Attack for ITV
the F1 in Schools competition, namely for the world finals events
presenter of the 2014 and 2016 World Branding Awards

Video games and film
He is the voice of the paddock reporter in the Codemasters F1 2010 game and in the sequel F1 2011. In F1 2012, F1 2013, and F1 2014, he guides the player through the games' respective menus, and in F1 2015, F1 2016, F1 2017,  F1 2018, F1 2019, F1 2020, F1 2021 and F1 22 he is a commentator during in-game sessions alongside Anthony Davidson and, in the latter of which, Natalie Pinkham.

Croft also voiced the character of Lofty Crofty in the European release of Planes. The character was the European equivalent of Colin Cowling.

Radio presenter
Croft has previously presented a midweek sports show and a Monday night football phone-in show on BBC London 94.9FM, where he has also stood in for Paul Ross and co-presented the Breakfast show first with JoAnne Good and then Gaby Roslin.

Croft is a fan of rock music and is regular contributor to Primordial Radio with his Crofty's Tracks  appearing on the afternoon show with Dewsbury.

References

External links

David Croft's Agent details 
BBC Biography
David Croft's Harvey Voices Profile

1970 births
Living people
British radio personalities
Darts commentators
Motorsport announcers
People from Stevenage
Sky Sports presenters and reporters